The Belgian railway line 75 is a railway line in Belgium connecting Ghent with Kortrijk and the French border near Mouscron. It was opened between 1839 and 1842. Beyond Mouscron the line continues onto Gare Lille Flandres in the French city of Lille.

Stations
The main interchange stations on line 75 are:

Gent-Sint-Pieters: to Antwerp, Brussels, Bruges, Oudenaarde and Eeklo
Deinze: to De Panne
Kortrijk: to Bruges, Oudenaarde and Ypres
Mouscron: to Tournai

References

75
Railway lines opened in 1839
3000 V DC railway electrification